Juan Costas Tordera (26 June 1945 – 2 September 2018) was a sailor from Spain, who represented his country at two Olympic Games. The first time was the 1976 Summer Olympics in Kingston, Ontario, Canada as helmsman in the Soling. With crew members Félix Anglada and Humberto Costas they took the 12th place. The second appearance was the 1988 Summer Olympics in Busan, South Korea as helmsman in the Star. With crew member José Pérez they took the 17th place.

Notes

References

External links
 
 
 
 

1945 births
2018 deaths
Spanish male sailors (sport)
Olympic sailors of Spain
Sailors at the 1976 Summer Olympics – Soling
Sailors at the 1988 Summer Olympics – Star
Sportspeople from Barcelona
Snipe class sailors